Edmund Prideaux may refer to:
 Sir Edmund Prideaux, 1st Baronet of Netherton (1554–1628), English lawyer
 Edmund Prideaux (Roundhead) (died 1659), English lawyer and member of Parliament
 Edmund Prideaux (MP for Taunton) (1632–1702), member of Parliament for Taunton
 Edmund Prideaux (artist) (1693–1745), English architectural artist
 Sir Edmund Prideaux, 4th Baronet (1647–1720), British lawyer and politician